The men's 5000 metres event at the 2009 Summer Universiade was held on 10–12 July.

Medalists

Results

Heats
Qualification: First 5 of each heat (Q) and the next 5 fastest (q) qualified for the final.

Final

References

Results (archived)

5000
2009